Moss Adams LLP is one of the 15 largest ( Accounting Today Top 100 Firms 2019) public accounting firms in the United States and provides accounting, tax and consulting services to public and private middle-market enterprises in many different industries.

Founded in 1913, and headquartered in Seattle, Washington, Moss Adams has offices in Washington, Oregon, California, Arizona, New Mexico, Kansas, Colorado, and Texas.

Moss Adams has an affiliate company — Moss Adams Wealth Advisors LLC — which offers clients additional services such as investment banking and asset management( Moss Adams LLP Company Information). In addition, Moss Adams provides consulting services in a variety of areas including: business consulting, information technology, litigation support, mergers & acquisitions, personal wealth, research, risk management, SEC/corporate finance and valuations.

Moss Adams is the largest accounting and consulting firm headquartered in the West. Its staff of over 3,800 includes over 380 partners( Moss Adams LLP, Fast Facts). Moss Adams is also a founding member of Praxity, an international association of independent accounting firms. This alliance is an association of independent firms in the major markets of North America, South America, Europe, and Asia. Other firms associated with Praxity include BKD LLP, Dixon Hughes Goodman LLP and Plante Moran.

References

External links
 http://www.mossadams.com

Business services companies established in 1913
Partnerships
Management consulting firms of the United States
Privately held companies based in Washington (state)
Accounting firms of the United States
Companies based in Seattle
1913 establishments in Washington (state)